Iris Smyles is an American writer. Her debut novel Iris Has Free Time (2013) was published by Soft Skull Press and Dating Tips for the Unemployed (2016), an informal companion novel, was published by Houghton Mifflin Harcourt and was a semi-finalist for the 2017 Thurber Prize for American Humor.
Smyles has also contributed stories and essays to The New York Times, The Atlantic, The New Yorker, Vogue, Paris Review Daily, Bomb, Guernica Magazine, New York Press, McSweeney's Internet Tendecy and Best American Travel Writing 2015. She also wrote columns for Splice Today and The East Hampton Star.

Smyles was co-founder of the online and print magazine Smyles & Fish, later turned into a "web museum", featuring works by Frederic Tuten, Jerome Charyn, Aurelie Sheehan, Shay K. Azoulay and others. The Capricious Critic by Ari Martin Samsky, a column commissioned for the site, was later published as a book edited and with an afterword by Smyles.

References

External links
 Review of Iris Has Free Time - Electric Literature
 Review of Iris Has Free Time - Elle

21st-century American novelists
City College of New York alumni
Living people
Year of birth missing (living people)
American women novelists
21st-century American women writers